Mike Woelfel is a Democratic member of the West Virginia Senate representing the 5th district. The 5th district includes all of Cabell County and a small portion of northern Wayne County. In 2022, Woelfel was chosen as Minority Leader of the Senate.

Legislature 
Woelfel was first elected in 2014 to succeed Evan Jenkins who left the Democratic Party and chose to run for Congress as a Republican. Woelfel's victory was a rare pick up for the Democratic Party during a year that otherwise saw major Republican gains in West Virginia. In 2020, Woelfel was appointed as Minority Whip for the Senate Democratic caucus. Two years later, Woelfel became the Minority Leader after his predecessor, Stephen Baldwin, lost re-election.

Personal 
Woelfel maintains a private personal injury law firm with his son, Matthew Woelfel. Prior to his time in the Senate, Woelfel served as an assistant prosecuting attorney in Cabell County and was appointed, on a part-time basis, to a juvenile judicial office for the Supreme Court of Appeals. He also served as an adjunct professor at Marshall University.

Election results

References

1954 births
21st-century American politicians
Democratic Party West Virginia state senators
Lawyers from Huntington, West Virginia
Living people
Marshall University alumni
Politicians from Huntington, West Virginia
West Virginia University College of Law alumni